Md. Hasibur Rashid is a Bangladeshi educationist and professor in the Department of Management Information Systems, Dhaka University. He is the fifth Vice-Chancellor of Begum Rokeya University, Rangpur (BRUR). Prior to his appointment as Vice-Chancellor, he was the second treasurer of the University.

Early life and education 
Rashid was born in the Rahimpur village of Ishwardi municipal area of Ishwardi Upazila of Pabna district. He completed his S.S.C. from S. M. High School and H.S.C. from Ishwardi Government College in 1970 and 1972 respectively. Rashid completed his bachelors and masters in management from the University of Dhaka in 1976 and 1977 respectively. 

Rashid completed an MBA from Western Michigan University in 1988. He completed a Masters of Philosophy from the University of Bath in 1996. He finished his PhD from the University of Dhaka in 2010.

Career 
Rashid has been teaching in the management department of Dhaka University for a long time He worked as an Associate Professor in the Department of Management, the University of Dhaka from October 31, 1986, to September 28, 2000. He was promoted to professor in the department in 2000. Since 2005, he has been teaching in the newly established Department of Management Information Systems at the same university.

In addition to teaching in a long career, he has held various important positions. In 2020, he was appointed as the second treasurer of Begum Rokeya University, Rangpur.

Rashid was appointed as the Vice-Chancellor of BRUR for the next four years on June 9, 2021, and the appointment will be effective from June 14, the official notification said. On 14 June 2021, Rashid took over as the fifth Vice-Chancellor of the Begum Rokeya University, Rangpur from Professor Nazmul Ahsan Kalimullah. On 23 November 2021, he cancelled winter holidays at the University.

References

Year of birth missing (living people)
Living people
University of Dhaka alumni
Academic staff of the University of Dhaka
Bangladeshi academics